First Spell is the second EP by the Norwegian black metal band Gehenna. A vinyl LP version, limited to 500 copies, was released in 1995 by Damnation Records. A cassette version was released by Isengard Distribution in 1994.

Track listing

Personnel
 Dolgar - vocals
 Sarcana - keyboards
 Dirge Rep - drums
 Svartalv - bass
 Sanrabb - guitars

Production
 Stamos Koliousis - remastering
 Mori - photography
 Beastus - photography
 T. Refsnes - engineering
 Evangelos Labrakis - remastering

External links
Releases at Official Gehenna Website

1994 EPs
Gehenna (band) albums